Elecnor Deimos is Elecnor's technological arm. The group specialises in the design, engineering and development of solutions and systems integration in the aerospace, defense, satellite systems, remote sensing, information systems and telecommunications network sectors.

Areas of activity
Elecnor Deimos operates in the following markets:
 Space
 Aeronautics
 Maritime
 Transport
 Industry and utilities
 Telecom and media

International presence
Elecnor Deimos is present in the following countries:
 Spain

 Tres Cantos (Madrid): Deimos Space Headquarters
 Puertollano (Ciudad Real): Deimos Castilla la Mancha Headquarters
 Boecillo (Valladolid)
 Portugal
 Lisbon: Deimos Engenharia Headquarters
 United Kingdom
 Harwell: Deimos Space UK Headquarters
 Romania
 Bucarest: Deimos Space Romania Headquarters

References

External links
 Official Elecnor Deimos website

Technology companies of Spain